William Brewer is an American novelist and poet. He is a Jones Lecturer at Stanford University.

Bibliography

Poetry 
I Know Your Kind (2017)

Novels 
The Red Arrow (2022)

References

External links 
Website

21st-century American novelists
American poets
Year of birth missing (living people)
Living people